Khuru or Khowru or Khurru may refer to:
 Khuru, Fars
 Khuru, Isfahan